Tuxedo is a provincial electoral division in the Canadian province of Manitoba. It was created by redistribution in 1979, and has formally existed since the provincial election of 1981. The riding is located in the southwest section of the city of Winnipeg.

Tuxedo is bordered to the east by River Heights, to the south by Charleswood and Fort Whyte, to the north by St. James, and to the west by Charleswood.

The riding's population in 1996 was 20,095. The average family income in 1999 was $89,350, almost $40,000 above the provincial average. The unemployment rate was 5.60%. Tuxedo has a significant Jewish population, at 8% of the total. Over 17% of the riding's residents are above 65 years of age, and over 28% have University degrees. Health and social services account for 16% of Tuxedo's industry, with a further 14% in the service sector.

Tuxedo has been represented by Progressive Conservative MLAs since its creation. Both of which went on to become Premiers of the province. Former Premier Gary Filmon represented the riding between 1981 and his retirement in 2000.

The current MLA is PC Party leader and Premier of Manitoba, Heather Stefanson.

List of provincial representatives
This riding has elected the following MLAs:

Electoral results

 
|Progressive ||David Pearlman 
|align="right"|104
|align="right"| 0.97

Previous boundaries

References

Manitoba provincial electoral districts
Politics of Winnipeg